Berezovka is a rural locality (a village) in Zhukovsky District, Bryansk Oblast, Russia. The population was 3 as of 2010. There is 1 street.

Geography 
Berezovka is located 18 km north of Zhukovka (the district's administrative centre) by road. Logvani and Olsufyevo are the nearest rural localities.

References 

Rural localities in Zhukovsky District, Bryansk Oblast